Peter Jann (born 1935) is an Austrian jurist and was a judge at the European Court of Justice from 19 January 1995 until 7 October 2009.

See also

List of members of the European Court of Justice

References

1935 births
Living people
Austrian judges
European Court of Justice judges
Austrian judges of international courts and tribunals
Date of birth missing (living people)